KFHW-LP is a radio station at 101.1 FM in Billings, Montana. It is owned by the Best of Billings Schools Association.

External links
 

FHW
FHW
Radio stations established in 2009